Supergirl is a DC Comics superhero character.

Supergirl or Super Girl may also refer to:

DC Comics characters and series 
 Supergirl (Kara Zor-El), Superman's cousin, a survivor of Krypton, and the most popular version of Supergirl
 Supergirl (Matrix), an other-dimensional shapeshifter
 Supergirl (Linda Danvers), an Earth-born angel
 Supergirl (Cir-El), Superman's daughter from an alternate timeline
 Supergirl (Arrowverse), an adaptation of Kara in the Arrowverse television franchise
 Other alternative versions of Supergirl in the DC Comics multiverse
 Supergirl (comic book), a series featuring various characters called "Supergirl"
 Supergirl: Wings, a DC Comics Elseworlds one-shot released in 2001
 Supergirl: Cosmic Adventures in the Eighth Grade, a series featuring Lena Thorul, the thirteen-year-old sister of Lex Luthor, who attends the same boarding school as Kara Zor-El

Film and television

Film
 Supergirl (1984 film), a 1984 film based on the character Kara Zor-El
 Supergirl (1973 film), a 1973 Filipino film
 Supergirl – Das Mädchen von den Sternen, a 1971 German film

 Super, Girls!, a 2007 Chinese documentary film by Jian Yi

Television
Supergirl (TV series), a 2015 U.S. television series based on the character Kara Zor-El
Super Girl (TV series), a 2004 Chinese singing competition show
The Super Girl, a 1979 Japanese television crime drama

Music

Bands
 Super Girls (Hong Kong band), a Hong Kong idol pop group
 Super Girls (Japanese band), a Japanese idol pop group

Albums
 Super Girl (album), a 2011 album by Kara
 Super Girl (EP), a 2009 EP by Super Junior-M
 SuperGirl, a 2008 album by Saving Jane

Songs
 "Supergirl" (Reamonn song), 2000
 "Supergirl" (Saving Jane song), 2008
 "Supergirl" (Hannah Montana song), a 2009 song by Miley Cyrus as Hannah Montana
 "Super Girl" (Super Junior song), 2009
 "Supergirl" (Stefania song), 2020 (the Greek entry for the Eurovision Song Contest 2020)
 "Supergirl", a 1965 song by The Fugs from The Fugs First Album
 "Super Girl", a 1966 song by Graham Bonney
 "Supergirl", a 1976 song by Johnny Cougar from Chestnut Street Incident
 "Super Girl", a 1988 song by Yasuyuki Okamura from the anime television series City Hunter 2
 "Supergirl", 1989 song by Rebecca
 "Supergirl", a 1997 song by Stereo Total from Monokini
 "Supergirl", 1998 song by Miss Papaya
 "Supergirl", a 2000 song by Folder 5
 "Supergirl!", a 2001 song by Krystal Harris from Me & My Piano
 "Supergirl", a song by Springbok Nude Girls on the 2001 album The Fat Lady Sings: Best of the Springbok Nude Girls 1995-2001
 "Supergirl", a 2005 song by Hilary Duff from Most Wanted
 "Supergirl (Demonstrations Skizze)", a 2005 song by Kashmir from No Balance Palace
 "Super Girl", a 2006 song by Gin Blossoms from Major Lodge Victory
 "Supergirl", a 2006 song by Minor Majority
 "Supergirl", a 2008 song by Kate Miller-Heidke from Curiouser
 "Super Girl", a 2010 song by Yuna Kim
 "Super Girl", a 2013 song by Ladies' Code from Code 01 Bad Girl

Other
 SuperGirls Championship, later renamed as the ECCW Women's Championship, a wrestling competition
 Super Girls FC, a Lebanese women's association football club

See also
Power Girl (Kara Zor-L), a character closely related to Supergirl
Laurel Gand, a character created as a replacement for Supergirl
Superwoman, the name of several fictional characters from DC Comics, most of which are roughly similar to Supergirl
Superman (disambiguation)
Superboy (disambiguation)